PyGTK is a set of Python wrappers for the GTK graphical user interface library. PyGTK is free software and licensed under the LGPL. It is analogous to PyQt/PySide and wxPython, the Python wrappers for Qt and wxWidgets, respectively. Its original author is GNOME developer James Henstridge. There are six people in the core development team, with various other people who have submitted patches and bug reports. PyGTK has been selected as the environment of choice for applications running on One Laptop Per Child systems.

PyGTK will be phased out with the transition to GTK version 3 and be replaced with PyGObject, which uses GObject Introspection to generate bindings for Python and other languages on the fly. This is expected to eliminate the delay between GTK updates and corresponding language binding updates, as well as reduce maintenance burden on the developers.

Syntax
The Python code below will produce a 200x200 pixel window with the words "Hello World" inside.

import gtk

def create_window():
    window = gtk.Window()
    window.set_default_size(200, 200)
    window.connect("destroy", gtk.main_quit)

    label = gtk.Label("Hello World")
    window.add(label)

    label.show()
    window.show()

create_window()
gtk.main()

Notable applications that have used PyGTK
PyGTK has been used in a number of notable applications, some examples:

 Anaconda installer
 BitTorrent
 Deluge
 Emesene
 Exaile
 Flumotion
 Gajim
 gDesklets
 Gedit (for optional Python subsystem and plugins)
 GIMP (for optional Python scripts)
 GNOME Sudoku
 Gramps
 Gwibber (microblogging client)
 Jokosher
 puddletag
 PyMusique
 Pybliographer
 Tryton
 ROX Desktop (includes ROX-Filer)
 SoundConverter
 Ubiquity (Ubuntu installer)
 Ubuntu Software Center
 Wing IDE
 Comix

PyGObject

PyGObject provides a wrapper for use in Python programs when accessing GObject libraries. GObject is an object system used by GTK, GLib, GObject, GIO, GStreamer and other libraries.

Like the GObject library itself, PyGObject is licensed under the GNU LGPL, so it is suitable for use in both free software and proprietary applications. It is already in use in many applications ranging from small single-purpose scripts to large full-featured applications.

PyGObject can dynamically access any GObject libraries that use GObject Introspection. It replaces the need for separate modules such as PyGTK, GIO and python-gnome to build a full GNOME 3.0 application.  Once new functionality is added to GObject library it is instantly available as a Python API without the need for intermediate Python glue.

Notable applications that use PyGObject
PyGObject has replaced PyGTK, but it has taken a considerable amount of time for many programs to be ported. Most of the software listed here has an older version which used PyGTK.

 Ex Falso
 Gramps
 Meld
 Pitivi
 PyChess
 Quod Libet

See also

 PyQt (Python wrapper for the Qt toolkit)
 PySide (Alternative Python wrapper for the Qt toolkit)
 wxPython (Python wrapper for the wx widgets collection)

References

External links
 PyGTK Homepage
 PyGTK FAQ
 PyGTK Tutorial
 PyGTK Notebook A Journey Through Python Gnome Technologies by Peter Gill
 PyGTK at Python wiki
 PyGObject Homepage
 PyGObject tutorial

GTK language bindings
Python (programming language) libraries
Software that uses PyGObject
Software that uses PyGTK
Widget toolkits